The , headquartered in Tokyo, is a public-private partnership between the Japanese government and 19 major corporations.

The INCJ was established as a temporary (15 years) corporate entity on July 27, 2009; with the prime objective of "boosting the competitiveness of Japanese firms by promoting a philosophy of 'open innovation' and creating next-generation businesses in promising new technologies by providing capital and managerial support, through private-public partnership."

The business and investments of INCJ are supervised by the Ministry of Economy, Trade and Industry of Japan (METI).

History 
In early 2009, the Japanese government along with major Japanese corporations conceptualized the legal framework of a corporate entity - whose aim is to leverage Japanese technological and industrial prowess to create sustainable next-generation businesses using a philosophy of  "Open Innovation" and enhance the value of Japanese businesses.

On July 27, 2009, the Japanese government under the Act on Special Measures for Industrial Revitalization and Other Laws to Foster Innovation in Industrial Activities in Japan, established the Innovation Network Corporation of Japan (INCJ). The INCJ was created to make investments aimed at creating an ecosystem of innovation and fostering an “open innovation” model, i.e. “flow of technology and expertise beyond the boundaries of existing organisational structures" — be it start-up companies, medium-sized enterprises or large, established firms.

The primary objective is to provide capital and managerial support to boost the competitiveness of Japanese firms and create next-generation businesses in promising new technologies, which contribute to innovative transformation of Japan’s industrial structure.

Organisation and leadership 
The INCJ is headquartered at Tokyo and has a flat management structure centered around CEO and COO

Its current CEO is Kimikazu Noumi and COO, Haruyasu Asakura.

Investments

Investors 
The INCJ is capitalized at 112 billion yen. The Japanese government also provides guarantees up to a total of 1,800 billion yen for INCJ investments. This funding is used partly as a combination of venture capital and “buyout fund” to provide risk arbitrage to support a growth strategy of small and mid-size companies and to facilitate consolidation among established companies for the purpose of helping them become global leaders, as well as directly invest in new ventures.

The breakup of investors and their investments made are the following,

Japanese Government 
The Japanese government provides 102 billion yen out of the total capital of 112 billion yen. The government also provides guarantees up to a total of 1,800 billion yen for INCJ investments, giving it an investment capability of approximately 1,900 billion yen (US$24 billion).

Corporate investors 
The following 19 major Japanese companies have made a total investment of 10 billion JPY. Each investor has contributed 500 million yen, with the exception of DBJ, which has contributed 1 billion yen.

 Asahi Kasei Corporation
 Osaka Gas Co., Ltd.
 Sharp Corporation
 The Shoko Chukin Bank, Ltd.
 Sumitomo Chemical Co., Ltd.
 Sumitomo Corporation
 Sumitomo Electric Industries, Ltd.
 Takeda Pharmaceutical Company Limited
 Tokyo Electric Power Company, Inc.
 Toshiba Corporation
 JGC Corporation
 Development Bank of Japan Inc.
 Panasonic Corporation
 East Japan Railway Company
 Hitachi, Ltd.
 Mizuho Corporate Bank, Ltd.
 MUFG Bank, Ltd.
 General Electric Company,Japan
 JX Nippon Oil & Energy Corporation

See also 

 Enterprise Turnaround Initiative Corporation of Japan

References

External links
 Official web site
 The Nature of Capitalism and Finance (ICNJ COO Haruyasu Asakura and Globis University Graduate School of Management) 

Japanese companies established in 2009
Financial services companies established in 2009
Venture capital firms of Japan
Public–private partnership projects
Government-owned companies of Japan